Atmosfer (Atmosphere) Metro Station, formerly called Alborz Metro Station is a station in Tehran Metro Line 5. It is located north of Lashkari Expressway and near Atmosfer Factory. It is between Garmdarreh Metro Station and Karaj Metro Station.

References

Tehran Metro stations
Railway stations opened in 2006